El Salvador competed at the 2008 Summer Olympics in Beijing, China, from 8 to 24 August 2008. This was the nation's ninth appearance at the Olympics.

Comité Olímpico de El Salvador sent a total of 11 athletes to the Games, 4 men and 7 women, to compete in 9 sports. Weightlifter Eva Dimas, who also carried the flag in 2000, was selected to carry her nation's flag during the opening ceremony.

Competitors 
Comité Olímpico de El Salvador selected a team of 11 athletes, 4 men and 7 women, to compete in 9 sports. Weightlifter Eva Dimas, at age 35, was the oldest athlete of the team, while cyclist Mario Contreras was the youngest at age 21.

| width=78% align=left valign=top |
The following is the list of number of competitors participating in the Games:

Athletics

Men
Track & road events

Women
Track & road events

Cycling

Road

Track
Pursuit

Omnium

Judo

Rowing

Women

Qualification Legend: FA=Final A (medal); FB=Final B (non-medal); FC=Final C (non-medal); FD=Final D (non-medal); FE=Final E (non-medal); FF=Final F (non-medal); SA/B=Semifinals A/B; SC/D=Semifinals C/D; SE/F=Semifinals E/F; QF=Quarterfinals; R=Repechage

Shooting

Women

Swimming

Women

Tennis

Weightlifting

Wrestling 

Women's freestyle

See also
El Salvador at the 2007 Pan American Games
El Salvador at the 2010 Central American and Caribbean Games

References

Nations at the 2008 Summer Olympics
2008
Summer Olympics